Teracotona abyssinica is a moth in the  family Erebidae. It was described by Walter Rothschild in 1933. It is found in Ethiopia and Kenya.

References

Natural History Museum Lepidoptera generic names catalog

Moths described in 1933
Spilosomina